Lighting Research & Technology is a peer-reviewed scientific journal covering all aspects of light and lighting. Its editor-in-chief is Steve Fotios (University of Sheffield). It was established in 1969 and is published by SAGE Publications on behalf of the Society of Light and Lighting (part of the Chartered Institution of Building Services Engineers).

Abstracting and indexing
The journal is abstracted and indexed in Scopus and the Science Citation Index Expanded. According to the Journal Citation Reports, its 2020 impact factor is 2.767.

References

External links
 
 Society of Light and Lighting

SAGE Publishing academic journals
English-language journals
Lighting
Quarterly journals
Engineering journals
Publications established in 1969